Touch Screen Cuisine (Chinese: 弹指间的料理) is a variety cooking show produced by Mediacorp Channel 8 and hosted by Vivian Lai and Ben Yeo. It began its run on 6 April 2016, every Wednesday at 8.00p.m.

Guests

Trivia
Episode 7 is the only episode to have the hosts switch places, as Vivian Lai could not stand Carrie Wong for not knowing how to chop the parsley.
Footage of Quan Yi Fong losing grip of the bowl while adding the other rempah ingredients into the wok is seen in episode 13 of Life Hacks.

References

Cooking television series
2016 Singaporean television series debuts
2016 Singaporean television series endings
Channel 8 (Singapore) original programming